China National Highway 102 is a major trunk route connecting Beijing to Fuyuan, Heilongjiang. In Beijing it is known as Jingfu Road, after the two cities' names, for connecting Beijing to Fuyuan.

It leaves Beijing as the Jingtong Expressway and Tongzhou–Yanjiao Expressway into Hebei Province (they are rare occurrences that sections of National Highways are built to National Expressway standards). It then runs alongside the Beijing–Shenyang Expressway along the coast until Shenyang, Liaoning, and then along the Shenyang–Harbin Expressway until Harbin.

It runs through the provinces of Hebei, Liaoning, Jilin and Heilongjiang. It connects major cities of Qinhuangdao, Shenyang, Changchun and Harbin. In 2013, under a new 2013-2030 plan by NDRC&MoT, the G102 has been extended to Fuyuan.

Route and distance

See also
 China National Highways
 AH1

Road transport in Beijing
Transport in Hebei
Transport in Liaoning
Transport in Jilin
Transport in Heilongjiang
102